Howard W. "Howie" Carroll (July 28, 1942 – October 1, 2021) was an American lawyer and Democratic politician who served in the Illinois General Assembly.

Born in Chicago, Illinois, Carroll received his bachelor's degree in business administration from Roosevelt University and his law degree from DePaul University College of Law. He practiced law in Chicago, Illinois. He served in the Illinois House of Representatives from 1971 to 1973. Carroll then served in the Illinois State Senate from 1973 to 1999.

Carroll ran for Congress in Illinois's 9th congressional district in 1998, but lost to then State Representative Jan Schakowsky in the Democratic primary, receiving 34.40% of the vote to Schakowsky's 45.14%.

On January 27, 2016, Senate President John Cullerton reappointed Carroll a member of the State Government Suggestion Award Board for a term expiring January 11, 2017. The State Government Suggestion Award Board administers the program that rewards state employees and the general public for suggestions to improve operation of state government which results in substantial monetary savings with a cash award.

Notes

1942 births
Living people
Politicians from Chicago
Roosevelt University alumni
DePaul University College of Law alumni
Democratic Party members of the Illinois House of Representatives
Democratic Party Illinois state senators